Referendums concerning the independence of judges and four-year parliamentary terms were put to New South Wales voters on 25 March 1995. The referendums coincided with that year's New South Wales general election. Both changes had the support of the major political parties and were approved by large majorities.


Independence of judges 
Voters were asked to strengthen protections of the political independence of judges and magistrates. The text of the question was "Do you approve of the Bill entitled: A Bill for an Act to prevent Parliament from changing laws about the independence of judges and magistrates without a referendum?"

Four-year terms 
Voters were asked to fix parliamentary terms at four years. Until then, while the maximum term was four years, premiers would call early elections if the political situation seemed more favourable than it might at the end of the term. This practice was a source of irritation for voters and opposition parties alike. The Fahey coalition government inherited the fixed four-year terms proposal. Fahey's predecessor, Nick Greiner, had promised a referendum on the subject, among other things, to three independents in order to keep office in 1991.

The text of the question was "Do you approve of the Bill entitled: A Bill for an Act to require the Parliament of New South Wales to serve full 4-year terms and to prevent politicians calling early general elections or changing these new constitutional rules without a further referendum?"

Results
Both changes were approved by a large majority.

See also 
 Referendums in New South Wales
 Referendums in Australia
 1995 New South Wales state election
 Government of New South Wales

Notes

References 

New South Wales Electoral Commission: 25 March 1995

New South Wales referendums
New South Wales referendums
Referendums in New South Wales
Referendums
New South Wales referendums